Telenor Cinclus is a Norwegian supplier of automatic meter reading. Products are marketed as Cinclus Technology. The company is owned by Telenor (66%) and Skagerak Energi (34%), the latter being a subsidiary of Statkraft. Telenor Cinclus is based at Fornebu outside Oslo, Norway. Additional offices are located in Lillehammer, Stockholm, Sweden and Vaasa, Finland.

In 2006, Telenor Cinclus signed an agreement with the energy companies E.ON and Fortum in Sweden to install 800,000 readers. The investment cost , but Telenor failed to correctly estimate the cost of installing the readers in each home. In 2007, the company lost NOK 300 million.

References

Companies based in Bærum
Energy companies established in 2004
2004 establishments in Norway
Telenor
Manufacturing companies established in 2004